The following is a list of ecoregions in Eswatini, as identified by the Worldwide Fund for Nature (WWF).

Terrestrial ecoregions
by major habitat type

Tropical and subtropical moist broadleaf forests
 Maputaland coastal forest mosaic

Tropical and subtropical grasslands, savannas, and shrublands
 Zambezian and mopane woodlands

Montane grasslands and shrublands
 Drakensberg montane forests, grasslands, and shrublands

Freshwater ecoregions
by bioregion

Zambezi
 Zambezian Lowveld

Southern Temperate
 Southern Temperate Highveld

References
 Burgess, Neil, Jennifer D’Amico Hales, Emma Underwood (2004). Terrestrial Ecoregions of Africa and Madagascar: A Conservation Assessment. Island Press, Washington DC.
 Thieme, Michelle L. (2005). Freshwater Ecoregions of Africa and Madagascar: A Conservation Assessment. Island Press, Washington DC.

Ecoregions of Eswatini
Eswatini
ecoregions